The Feathered Serpent is a British children's television series made for ITV by Thames Television. Set in pre-Columbian Mexico and starring Patrick Troughton as the scheming High Priest Nasca. Two series were transmitted in 1976 and 1978.

Cast
 Nasca: Patrick Troughton
 Chimalma: Diane Keen
 Heumac: Brian Deacon
 Kukulkan: Tony Steedman
 Tozo: Richard Willis
 Mahoutec: Robert Gary
 Chadac: George Lane Cooper
 Maxtla: Alfred Hoffman
 Otolmi: George Cormack
 Xipec: Granville Saxton
 Keelag: Sheila Burrell
 Mataque: Robert Russell

Crew
 Written by John Kane
 Designed by Patrick Downing
 Music composed by David Fanshawe
 Produced and Directed by Vic Hughes

DVD release
A DVD containing both series of The Feathered Serpent was released in the UK in February 2009.

External links
 
 

1970s British children's television series
Television series set in the Pre-Columbian era
ITV children's television shows
1976 British television series debuts
1978 British television series endings
Television series by Fremantle (company)
Television shows produced by Thames Television
English-language television shows
Aztecs in fiction
Fictional indigenous people of the Americas